The Durham Women's cricket team is the women's representative cricket team for the English historic county of Durham. They played their home games at various grounds across the county, including Green Lane Cricket Ground, Durham, County Durham and Park Drive, Hartlepool. They competed in the Women's County Championship from 2001 to 2019 and in the Women's Twenty20 Cup from 2009 to 2019. In 2020, it was announced that Durham was merging its team with Northumberland, becoming North East Warriors. They are partnered with the regional side Northern Diamonds.

History

1930–2000: Early History
Durham Women played their first recorded match in 1930, against Lancashire and Cheshire Women, which they won by 16 runs. Over the following years, Durham played various one-off matches against surrounding teams, often combined with Northumberland Women. In the early 2000s, Durham also played various games against Scotland Women.

2001– : Women's County Championship
In 2001, Durham Women played in the Emerging Counties competition, which they won, thereby earning promotion to the Women's County Championship. In their first season, they finished 5th in Division 3, but were promoted the following season. After being relegated in 2004, Durham then began a steady climb through the divisions, reaching Division 2 in 2012, where they remained for four seasons. Subsequent years saw them challenging for promotion again, just missing out in 2017, losing a play-off against Northamptonshire, but achieving it in 2018, beating Oxfordshire by 85 runs. In 2019, however, they finished bottom of Division Two. In the Women's Twenty20 Cup, meanwhile, Durham were a consistent Division Two side, achieving their best finish, 2nd, in 2019. In 2021, they competed as a joint team with Northumberland, as North East Warriors, after the two teams merged in 2020.

Players

Notable players
Players who have played for Durham and played internationally are listed below, in order of first international appearance (given in brackets):

 Kari Carswell (2001)
 Danielle Hazell (2009)
 Morna Nielsen (2010)
 Louise McCarthy (2010)
 Becky Glen (2018)
 Aaliyah Alleyne (2019)
 Elysa Hubbard (2022)

Seasons

Women's County Championship

Women's Twenty20 Cup

See also
 Durham County Cricket Club
 North East Warriors
 Northern Diamonds

Notes

References

Women's cricket teams in England
Cricket in County Durham